Roger Federer defeated Novak Djokovic in the final, 6–1, 7–5 to win the men's singles tennis title at the 2009 Cincinnati Masters.

Andy Murray was the defending champion, but lost in the semifinals to Federer.

Seeds
The top eight seeds receive a bye into the second round.

Main draw

Finals

Top half

Section 1

Section 2

Bottom half

Section 3

Section 4

Qualifying

Seeds

Qualifiers

Lucky loser

Qualifying draw

First qualifier

Second qualifier

Third qualifier

Fourth qualifier

Fifth qualifier

Sixth qualifier

Seventh qualifier

References

External links
Main Draw
Qualifying Draw

Masters - Singles